The 2022 British Superbike Championship season was the 35th British Superbike Championship season. The title was won by Bradley Ray. The season was marred by the death of Chrissy Rouse a few days after an incident during the final race at Donington Park.

Teams and riders

Race calendar and results

Championship standings

Riders' championship
Scoring system
Points are awarded to the top fifteen finishers. A rider has to finish the race to earn points.

References 

British Superbike Championship
Brttish Superbike
Superbike